The 1919 Chicago Maroons football team was an American football team that represented the University of Chicago during the 1919 college football season.  In their 28th season under head coach Amos Alonzo Stagg, the Maroons compiled a 5–2 record, finished in third place in the Big Ten Conference, and outscored their opponents by a combined total of 205 to 26.

Schedule

References

Chicago
Chicago Maroons football seasons
Chicago Maroons football